The following is a list of best-selling singles by country. Depends on the measurement, record sales of songs are taken by estimations or certifications.

Sheet music dominated the early stage of music publishing industry with many individual titles selling millions of "copies". Before the start of the "album era" in the mid-1960s, the singles format dominated the recording industry in a number of countries, and once again during the ongoing streaming era in the early late-2000s.

Argentina

Australia

Austria

Belgium

Brazil

Canada

Chile

Colombia

Cuba 
According to some estimates, "Miénteme" (1954) by Olga Guillot sold one million copies in Cuba.

Denmark

Ecuador

Egypt

El Salvador

Finland

France

Germany

Ghana

India

Ireland

Italy 

Additional information: According to a 1969 report from SEDRIM, then Italian mechanical rights society, Italy was a singles-market with songs accounting 85.8 percent of total record sales in the country. A "top hit" single in Italy at that time was grouped between 500,000 and 700,000 copies.

Jamaica 
"Legalize It" is "one of Jamaica's top-selling singles".

Japan

Malta
"Taxi Mary" by Fredu Abela (il-Bamboċċu) is considered to be Malta's highest selling record/single of all time.

Mexico

Netherlands

Nigeria

Norway 

Additional information: Until 1965, the average of copies sold of singles in Norway, with a population of 3.5 million, was between 1,500 and 2,000 copies. In comparison, "I Love You Because" of Jim Reeves sold up that point 100,000 copies, which was considered a "tremendous amount" and became the highest-selling record in the country.

Philippines

Poland

Portugal

Russia 
By September 2000, "Solo" by Alsou was considered to be the best-selling single ever in Russia. It sold at least 60,000 units in four weeks.

South Africa

South Korea

Spain

Sweden

Switzerland

United Kingdom

United States

Latin

USSR

Yugoslavia

See also 
 List of best-selling singles
 List of best-selling albums by country
 List of best-selling sheet music

Notes

References 

Lists of best-selling singles